The 2018 Tajik Cup is the 27th edition of the Tajik Cup, the knockout football tournament of Tajikistan. The cup winner qualifies for the 2019 AFC Cup.

Preliminary round
The draw of the preliminary round was held on 28 April 2018.

First legs: 1–2 May; Second legs: 17–18 May.

"Isfara" - "Parvoz" (1/5) 3:3 (17/5) 3:2 (agg) 5:4

"Hulbuk" - "Saroykamar" (awd.) 0:3

"Ravshan" - "Vahdat" (1/5) 0:3 (17/5) 1:1 (agg) 1:4

"Dusty" - "Dushanbe-83" (1/5) 1:1 (17/5) 0:4 (agg) 1:5

"Shokhin" - "Somon" (1/5) 1:1 (17/5) 2:6 (agg) 3:7

"Istravshan" - "Eshata" (2/5) 2:1 (18/5) 1:1 (agg) 3:2

"Faizkand" - "Zarafshon" (2/5) 3:2 (18/5) 3:1 (agg) 6:3

"Lokomotiv-Pamir" Bye

Round of 16
The draw for the main rounds was held on 25 May 2018.

Quarter-finals

Semi-finals

Final

See also
2018 Tajik League

External links

Tajik Cup News

References

Tajikistan Cup
Tajikistan
Tajik Cup